Michael I. Belkin (born June 29, 1945)
is a former top-ranked Canadian tennis player.

Canada's top-ranked player five times between 1966 and 1972,  Belkin had a career 17–12 Davis Cup record, including a 14–7 record in singles.

The right-handed Belkin attained a career-high singles ranking of no. 7 world amateur during the early 1960s.  He joined the fledgling professional tour in the later half of his playing career, compiling a 36–36 career singles win–loss record.   He reached the quarter-finals at the 1968 Australian Championships, which he lost to top seed William Bowrey. The field was especially weak that year as nine of the top amateurs of 1967 had turned pro.  He also reached the third round in singles in his inaugural Wimbledon.

Belkin's best Grand Prix results were semi-finals appearances in 1969 at both the Cincinnati event and Canadian Open.

Youth, junior, and college tennis
Belkin was one of Canada's early tennis phenoms, with his parents moving to Miami Beach when he was 12 for the sake of his tennis.  He won the United States National Boys' (15 and under) singles championship, and won the prestigious Orange Bowl boys and junior (18 and under) singles titles, coincidentally played in Miami Beach, in 1960 and 61 respectively.

While still a student at Miami Beach High School, the right-handed Belkin was Florida men's champion, defeating both Frank Froehling and Gardnar Mulloy to become so.  He was also U.S. National Junior Champion (18 and under) champion, according to a March, 1963 Sports Illustrated article.   It goes on to describe how Belkin was an excellent clay court player without any tournament experience on grass.  His game was built around an excellent baseline game with both a solid forehand and two-handed backhand.  At the time of the article, the 17-year-old Belkin was 3 months into revising his game to include serve and volley technique.

Belkin was a top-ranking collegiate player attending the University of Miami.  He reached the finals of the 1965 NCAA individual championships where he lost to Arthur Ashe 4–6, 1–6, 1–6.

Senior amateur tennis
As a 16-year-old, Belkin lost to Briton Roger Taylor in straight sets in the opening round of the 1961 U.S. Championships.>  He again lost in the first round at the 1962 U.S. Championship, this time in five sets, to American James Farrin.  And the year after, for a third consecutive time, Belkin lost in the first round of the same tournament, this time in straight sets to Norman Berry.

In 1964, Belkin played Wimbledon Championship for the first time, and fared well given his lack of experience on grass.  He defeated Claude de Gronckel in the first round, and Cliff Drysdale in the second, both in four sets, before falling to Bob Hewitt in the third, in straight sets. At the 1964 U.S. Championships later that summer, Belkin defeated Rodney Susman in the first round before falling to Cliff Richey in the second in five sets.

Having not competed in singles in any main draws of grand slam tournaments in 1965, Belkin played in two in 1966.  At Roland Garros he lost in the first round, to Pancho Guzmán in four sets.  At Wimbledon, Belkin reached the second round.  He defeated Australian Jim Moore in straight sets before falling to No. 4 seed Manuel Santana 0–6, 1–6, 2–6.  In 1967 he again did not compete in a grand slam event.

At the 1968 Australian Championships, in addition to reaching the quarters in singles, a run which saw victories over one M. Marchment, Max Pettman, and Allan Stone, Belkin reached the second round in doubles partnering Geoff Pollard.

Professional tour tennis

1969
Belkin played the 1969 French Open, but was forced to abandon his match against Georges Goven up two sets.  He and partner Pancho Guzmán withdrew from their first round doubles match.

In the summer, Belkin played the Cincinnati Championships, defeating Phil Dent and Stan Smith in the later rounds to reach the semi-finals.  In doubles, he and partner Luis Ayala lost in the second round, to Arthur Ashe and Charlie Pasarell.  The following week Belkin played U.S. Clay Court Championships, reaching the quarters in both singles and doubles.  In singles he defeated Franklin Robbins, Goven, and Jim Osborne before falling to Ashe in three sets.  In doubles he played with Bob Carmichael.

Two weeks later, Belkin played the Canadian Open, reaching the semis in singles, where he lost a four-setter to Cliff Richey and the quarters in doubles, partnering compatriot Vic Rollins.  Later in August, at the second ever U.S. Open, Belkin lost to Marty Riessen in the second round in singles, and the first round in doubles, partnering Frank Tutvin.

1970
Belkin only played the main draw of only four professional circuit events in 1970, Cincinnati, the U.S. Clay Court Championships, Canadian Open, and U.S. Open, playing doubles in only the latter two events.

At Cincinnati, Belkin was soundly beaten by Jeff Borowiak in the first round 1–6, 1–6.  The following week in Indianapolis, he defeated Jean-Baptiste Chanfreau and G. Turner Howard before losing in three sets to Croat Željko Franulović.

In Toronto, Belkin had a bye into the second round where he lost handily to Andrés Gimeno 2–6, 1–6.  At Forest Hills, he also lost his first match in straight sets, in the first round to Frenchman player Pierre Barthes.  In doubles at both tournaments, Belkin and partner John Sharpe lost in the first round.

1971
More active on the tour in 1971, Belkin competed in main draws in a total of 11 events, all Pepsi-Cola Grand Prix events but one, but not in any grand slam tournaments.  In mid-February he played the New York Grand Prix, losing in the first round in singles, to Manuel Orantes 4–6, 0–6, and doubles, partnering Richard Russell.  The following week he competed in the Salisbury Grand Prix (in Salisbury, Maryland), and again lost handily in the first round in singles, 2–6, 4–6 to Joaquin Loyo-Mayo.  In doubles, he and partner Tom Edlefsen reached the second round.

The following week, Belkin played the Macon Outdoor and did even better.  Having a first round bye, he beat Jan Kodeš 6–1, 7–5, before falling to Tom Gorman 2–6, 5–7.  In doubles, he and partner Nikola Špear won two matches to reach the quarter-finals, where they lost to Kodes and Željko Franulović.  The following week at the Hampton Grand Prix, Belkin lost in the first round in both singles and doubles, falling in singles to Ion Ţiriac and in doubles partnering Edlefsen for a second time.

In April Belkin reached the semi-finals of the Houston Outdoor, losing in five sets in that round to Clark Graebner.  His next action was in July, at the Washington Star International, a WCT event.  He scored easy wins over Roscoe Tanner and Patricio Cornejo before losing to Andrés Gimeno 6–4, 2–6, 3–6.  In doubles, Belkin and Richard Russell reached the second round.  The following week in singles, Belkin reached the semi-finals of the Tanglewood Grand Prix, losing to Franulovic.  In the quarters he crushed rookie tour player Jimmy Connors 6–1, 6–2.

One week later Belkin reached the third round of the Cincinnati Outdoor, beating Rudy Hernando and Brian Gottfried before succumbing to Jaime Fillol.  In doubles, he again partnered Russell and the tandem reached the second round.  The following week Belkin competed at the Canadian Open, losing in the first round in singles to Ray Ruffels, and in doubles partnering once again John Sharpe.  The week after he lost to Ruffels again in Canada, and nearly by the identical score, at the Toronto WCT event.  Belkin played one final time in 1971, singles at the Sacramento Outdoor, losing again in the first round, this time to Raymond Moore by default.

1972
Belkin played four American winter indoor events.  In early February, he lost handily in singles in the first round in Omaha and Kansas City in consecutive weeks, both times to Ilie Năstase.  At the later tournament he also played doubles, with he and partner Tom Edlefsen losing in the second round.  Two weeks later, Belkin reached the second round in singles in Salisbury, defeating Milan Holeček 6–3, 6–4, before falling to Roscoe Tanner 3–6, 3–6.  In doubles, he and partner Hans Kary lost in the first round.  The following week at the New York Indoor, Belkin lost in the first round to Alejandro Olmedo 3–6, 4–6.

Belkin saw his next main draw action in August.  At the Tanglewood Grand Prix, he lost to Dick Stockton 4–6, 3–6.  The following week at the U.S. Clay Court Championships, on Belkin's strongest surface, clay, he beat Jun Kuki and Adriano Panatta before falling to Bob Hewitt in the round of 16.  The following week in Montreal, he lost however in the first round, to Onny Parun, 7–6, 3–6, 1–6.  In doubles, he and partner Eddie Dibbs reached the quarter-finals, losing there to the famous doubles team of Hewitt and Frew McMillan.  Two weeks later at the U.S. Open, Belkin was level with Cliff Drysdale in the first set 5 games when he retired from the match.  Belkin was entered one more main draw, in mid-September, the Montreal WCT, but withdraw from his first round match in both singles and doubles (partnering compatriot Richard Legendre).

1973
Belkin opened 1973 playing 3 indoor events in the States.  He lost in the first round to Herb Fitzgibbon in singles and in doubles partnering Nicholas Kalogeropoulos at the Baltimore Indoor in early January.  Two weeks later at the Birmingham Indoor,  Belkin reached the second round in singles beating Szabolcz Baranyi 6–4, 6–1, before losing to Jürgen Fassbender 3–6, 5–7.  In doubles, he and partner Gavorielle Marcu lost in the first round.  The following week, Belkin lost in the first round at the Omaha Indoor to Baranyi 3–6, 0–6.

The final 3 events Belkin played this year were ones held in Canada.  In middle February, at the Calgary Indoor, Belkin defeated Hans Kary in three sets before falling to Paul Gerken 3–6, 1–6.  In doubles he and partner Pat Cramer lost in the  opening round.  In August at the Canadian Open, Belkin beat Adriano Panatta 6–4, 6–3 in the first round and lost to Iván Molina in the second 4–6, 2–6.   In October, Belkin appeared at the Quebec Grand Prix, losing in the first round to Haroon Rahim 4-6, 6-7(5).  In doubles, he and partner, veteran Quebecer Robert Bedard, lost in the first round as well, 3–6, 1–6 to Onny Parun and Raymond Moore.

Belkin entered the first computer rankings, on September 13 at No. 145.  Two weeks later, with the next rankings released, he stood at No. 128, his career high.  In the final rankings released for the year, on December 14, Belkin was No. 161.

1974, 1975
Belkin played one event in 1974, the U.S. Pro Tennis Championships, where he lost in the first round to Guillermo Vilas 2–6, 2–6.  On December 12, his singles ranking stood at World No. 318.

In 1975, Belkin competed in two events, also only in singles, both in Florida, his home state.  These would be his last tour events to appear in.  In early February, he lost in the first round to Jeff Borowiak 6–7(5), 1–6 at the St. Petersburg WCT.  Two weeks later, at the Boca Raton Grand Prix, he completed his touring career with his best result in years, reaching the quarter-finals.  He defeated Rolf Thung 6–1, 6–4, Jan Kodeš 7–5, 1–6, 7–6, before losing to Jürgen Fassbender 4–6, 3–6.  This saw his next ranking, on March 5, rise to World No. 208.  His final ranking, released on December 15 saw him rated at No. 222.

Davis Cup

Belkin first played Davis Cup for Canada in 1966 in two ties as Canada advanced to the Europe Group quarterfinals.  Against Finland in the first round, Belkin won the second rubber over Rauno Suominen 6–1, 6–3, 3–6, 6–3.  He also won a dead rubber as Canada defeated the Finns 4–1.  In the next round however, Canada went up a strong French team at Roland Garros stadium.  Belkin lost the opening rubber 1–6, 6–4, 3–6, 4–6 to François Jauffret.  Belkin also lost the final, dead, rubber in 5 sets to Pierre Darmon as Canada was swept 0–5.

The following year Belkin defeated Mike Sangster 6-2, 6-3, 3-6, 6-1 in the opening rubber against Great Britain in Europe Group first round action, played in Bournemouth on clay.  Britain won the next four rubbers however, including the doubles 12-10 in the fifth, with Roger Taylor and Bobby Wilson overcoming Belkin and Keith Carpenter.

In 1968, Canada again fell at the first hurdle, losing the first round of North and Central America Semifinal action against Mexico.  Played in Mexico City on clay, Mexico swept Canada 5-0.  Belkin lost the second rubber 14-16, 6-4, 3-6, 3-6 to Joaquim Loyo-Mayo.  He again partnered Carpenter in the doubles, a match lost in straight sets.

The following year Canada defeated the Netherlands 3-2 in the first round of Europe Group, with Belkin winning all 3 rubbers.  In a tie played in Scheveningen, first he defeated Niklaus Fleury 6-4, 6-4, 6-0 in the second rubber.  He and Harry Fauquier then won the doubles rubber in four sets.  Then, in the deciding fifth rubber, Belkin beat Jan Horduk 6-1, 6-1, 6-2.  In the next round, Canada faced the Soviet Union, in Moscow, and lost 1-4.  Belkin took the only rubber off the Soviets when he beat Toomas Leius 7-9, 6-3, 4-6, 6-2, 9-7.  In a fifth, dead, rubber, Belkin retired down 2 sets to Alex Metreveli.

In 1970, Canada won two ties before succumbing to Brazil in the Americas Inter-Zone final.  To reach that final they first beat the Caribbean and then New Zealand in the North and Central American Group.  They swept the Caribbean in early June in Winnipeg on clay, with Belkin defeating Lance Lumsden in five sets in the 2nd rubber and teaming with John Sharpe to win the doubles in straight sets.  They then a week later beat New Zealand 3-2 in at the same venue.  Belkin lost the first rubber to Brian Fairlie in straight sets.  He then teamed with Sharpe to win the doubles.  Belkin then won the deciding rubber over Onny Parun 6-2, 3-6, 7-5, 6-3.  Against Brazil in São Paulo, Belkin leveled the tie at a win apiece when Belkin beat José Edison Mandarino.  He and Sharpe however lost the doubles tie in 5 sets, despite being up 2 sets to 1.  Belkin then beat Thomaz Koch in four sets to again level the tie.  John Sharpe was trounced by Mandarino in the final however, 1-6, 0-6, 2-6.

In 1971, Canada lost its only tie of the year, 2-3 to Mexico in Mexico City.  Belkin won the second rubber over Loyo-Mayo in four sets, to level the tie.  He and Sharpe lost the doubles, however, in four sets, to give the Mexicans the lead.  Belkin won the fourth rubber over Marcelo Lara to, again, level the tie at 2-2.  In the decider, Sharpe, facing Loyo-Mayo, won the first set but proceeded to lose the next three to lose.  The following year saw the same foe and exactly the same result, a 2-3 loss, this time at a tie held in Vancouver (at Jericho Tennis Club).  Belkin again beat Loyo-Mayo, this time in rubber 1 and in five sets.  Canada again lost the doubles rubber, as Belkin and Dale Power lost in four sets.  Loyo-Mayo then defeated Anthony Bardsley in straight sets to give the win to Mexico.  Belkin beat Raúl Ramírez in a dead, fifth rubber.

Belkin concluded his Davis Cup career retiring from rubber 1 against Iván Molina of Colombia, having lost the first set 7-9.  Canada lost the North and Central America Group preliminary round tie 1-4.  Belkin's career Davis Cup win-loss stands at 14 and 7 in singles and 3 and 5 in doubles, with all matches played outdoors on clay.

Honours
Belkin was inducted into the Canadian Tennis Hall of Fame in 1994.

Post tour career
As of 2006, Belkin was tennis director at the Sonesta Beach Resort on Key Biscayne, Florida.  He joined the resort in 1993. In 1993 Mike Belkin's son Mark Belkin was Born. Mark Belkin was an inspiring Young tennis Champion having won 80 trophies in 4 years. He was Top-10 in the Florida for two age groups. Mike Belkin's son attended Coral Gables Senior High and played tennis there for all 4 Years, his final record was 44-2.

References

External links
 
 
 
 Canadian Tennis Hall of Fame

1945 births
Living people
Anglophone Quebec people
Canadian expatriates in the United States
Canadian male tennis players
Miami Hurricanes men's tennis players
Sportspeople from Miami-Dade County, Florida
Tennis people from Florida
Tennis players at the 1967 Pan American Games
Tennis players from Montreal
Pan American Games competitors for Canada